"GIFT" is a triple-single released by the Japanese boyband Kanjani Eightstylized Kanjani∞. The three singles are the band's 11th, 12th, and 13th singles. The songs were released  during the Christmas period. Each single release, except "Green", contains two songs; Green has three songs. Each single has cover art reflecting the color theme of each single. GIFT was advertised as a gift from the group members to their fans.

The "GIFT" singles have seven Christmas-themed songs; some were written or composed by members of the group. Shota Yasuda designed the label for the single; Kanjani8 collectively photographed the backstage activities and  provided creative ideas for the jacket design. Like the previous singles since "It's My Soul", member Tadayoshi Okura dresses as Santa Claus as the singles' joke for this release. He appears in the outfit on "Gift ~Green~", completing the group picture that spans the backs of all three singles.

On December 29, 2009, it was announced that Kanjani8 had broken an Oricon record by having three singles released on three consecutive days, and monopolized the top ten weekly rankings by reaching the top three. This was the first time an album or single release had done this. When they were asked about it, member You Yokoyama said, "Being the first to have a three day consecutive release and be the first to have it in the top 1, 2, 3 spots make me really happy".

Track listing

White

Red
 "I wish"

Green
 
 "One day in winter"
 "Snow White"

Charts

References

2009 EPs
Kanjani Eight songs
Oricon Weekly number-one singles
Billboard Japan Hot 100 number-one singles